Avitriptan (INN) (code name BMS-180,048) is an antimigraine drug of the triptan family which was never marketed. It acts as a 5-HT1B and 5-HT1D receptor agonist.

See also
 Donitriptan

References

5-HT1B agonists
5-HT1D agonists
Triptans
Pyrimidines
Piperazines
Aromatic ethers
Sulfonamides